Stollberg is a town in Saxony, Germany, in the district Erzgebirgskreis. It is situated 20 km east of Zwickau and 17 km southwest of Chemnitz. It was the site of the Hoheneck women's prison until 2001.

References 

Erzgebirgskreis